The Wet Mountain Valley is a high elevation mountain valley mostly located in Custer County but extending southward into Huerfano County in south-central Colorado. Westcliffe and Silver Cliff are the two towns in the valley which is mostly devoted to cattle ranching.

Geography
The Wet Mountain Valley is nestled beneath the  Wet Mountains on the east, and the Sangre de Cristo Range that parallels the valley on the west. Both mountain ranges are in the Sangre de Cristo Mountains system of the Southern Rocky Mountains.

The two towns in the valley are Westcliffe and Silver Cliff which are located side by side at an elevation of just under . According to the U.S. census for 2020, Westcliffe has a population of 435 and Silver Cliff has a population of 609. DeWeese Reservoir is near the two towns. The valley is known for its historic ranches. Conservation easements preserve some of the ranches from sub-division and development. Silver mining attracted early settlers. Both had a population of more than 1,000 people in 1880.  

The valley is drained by two major creeks, both of which rise in the Sangre de Cristos. Grape Creek begins in the south of Custer County near Music Pass and flows north into DeWeese Reservoir; from there it enters a narrow gorge before reaching the Arkansas River. Texas Creek begins northwest of Westcliffe and flows to the northeast meeting the Arkansas River at US Highway 50. A small part of the valley drains southward into the Huerfano River.

In 2015, Westcliff and Silver Cliff became an International Dark Sky Community, the first in Colorado, the ninth in the world, and at the highest elevation of all dark sky communities. The designation as a dark sky community requires a local effort to limit light pollution. An observatory in Westcliffe welcomes tourists.

Climate
The Wet Mountain Valley has a Dfb climate (humid continental with warm summers and cold winters) in the Koppen Classification system and DCblo (humid continental with mild summers and cold winters) in the Trewartha climate classification system. Precipitation was  annually with the majority in the summer. Snowfall averaged  annually. The highest elevations of the valley may have a Dfc (continental subarctic) climate.

References

Valleys of Colorado
Landforms of Custer County, Colorado
Sangre de Cristo Mountains